Charles Roland Berry (born  1957 in Boston, Massachusetts) is an American composer. He studied  music history and music composition at the University of California with Peter Racine Fricker. Fricker taught him the intricate details of serialist music, and to discipline his musical imagination. He was not the best of students, due to his enthusiastic attitude and very short attention span. Later on, in 1982, he met Paul Creston in San Diego, California, and studied composition with him for one year.

Biography
For a time, he hosted a classical radio program on KBOO, community radio, in Portland, Oregon. He would host telephone interviews with famous composers. Some of these people included; Benjamin Lees, John Cage, George Crumb, George Rochberg, Ned Rorem,  Karel Husa, and William Schuman. Berry edited the interviews to make them a half-hour in length, often adding excerpts of the particular composers music.

In Santa Cruz, California, he became acquainted with the Hungarian cellist, composer, and former conductor for the Honolulu Symphony, George Barati. In the 1990s he presented performances of his music in San Francisco with George Barati, Lou Harrison, and an electronic composer, Charles Amirkhanian.  Mr. Berry records exclusively for Centaur Records.  His Cello Concerto, Symphony No. 3 and other works were released in 2008 on Centaur CD #2898.

American male composers
21st-century American composers
Living people
1957 births
Interlochen Center for the Arts alumni
Musicians from Boston
21st-century American male musicians
Centaur Records artists